This is a list of electoral results for the electoral district of Wolston in Queensland state elections.

Members for Wolston

Election results

Elections in the 1980s

Elections in the 1970s

References

Queensland state electoral results by district